Guy Wilthew, real name Gerard Herbert Guy Smith, is an English artist born on 31 January 1876 in Shortland Grove, Beckenham and died in 1920 in Le Faouët.

Biography
Guy Wilthew settled in Faouët, a small village which attracted many artists to it.  Here he married the daughter of a local artist Louis Le Leuxhe. Her name was Marguerite. They had three children, Guy, Armelle and Marguerite and eventually moved to Vannes. Wilthew was the great-grandfather of Louise Bourgoin.

Works 
 "Le bénitier de la chapelle Saint-Fiacre  This study of two Bretons standing by a stoup was painted in 1898.

Gallery

References

External links
 https://www.guywilthew.com/gerard-hubert-smith-gw

1876 births
1929 deaths
20th-century English painters
English male painters
Breton art
20th-century English male artists